In Australia, a milk bar is a suburban local general store which can include delicatessens or "delis" and corner shops or corner stores.  Similar, but not identical, establishments include tuck shops. Milk bars are traditionally a place where people buy newspapers, and fast-food items such as fish and chips, hamburgers, milkshakes, and snacks. They are essentially a smaller-scale suburban form of the convenience store but are more likely to be "mum and dad" small businesses rather than larger franchised operations.

The National Milk Bar franchise was a café chain in the United Kingdom, founded in the 1930s.

History
 
The first business using the name "milk bar" was started in India in 1930 by an Englishman, James Meadow Charles when he opened Lake View Milk Bar at Bangalore. The concept soon spread to the United Kingdom, where it was encouraged by the Temperance Society as a morally acceptable alternative to the pub, and over 1,000 milk bars had opened nationally by the end of 1936. Milk bars were known in the United States at least as early as 1940 as evidenced by contemporary radio recordings.

By the late 1940s, milk bars had evolved to not only sell groceries, but were also places where young people could buy ready-made food and non-alcoholic drinks, and could socialise. Milk bars often had jukeboxes and pinball machines (later upgraded to video games), with tables and chairs to encourage patrons to linger and spend more money.

The milk bar as a social venue was gradually replaced by fast food franchises, such as McDonald's, and shopping malls. Much of the elaborate decor has disappeared from the remaining milk bars. They are still found in many areas, often serving as convenience stores.

Modern era

Australia

Milk bars in Australia today almost universally sell ice creams, lollies, chocolate bars, soft drinks, newspapers, bread, cigarettes and occasionally fast food. Most generally serve milk (in cartons or bottles) or other dairy related products. Although there are far fewer milk bars than there were during the 1970s and 80s due to changing shopping habits, most people living in suburban areas still have a milk bar within walking distance or a short drive of their home.

United Kingdom
In the United Kingdom, the National Milk Bar franchise was founded in 1933 by Robert William Griffiths as an ordinary café/restaurant chain which is related to the original milk bars in name only. Once numbering around 20 outlets, which were located in Wales and in England near the Welsh border, now only one remains. In the UK, corner shops serve a similar function to milk bars in modern Australia, providing everyday groceries, sweets, newspapers and such.

There is a campaign in the United Kingdom to encourage schoolchildren to consume more dairy products, by installing 'milk bars' in schools. The idea is that if the dairy products are attractively presented and properly stored, the children will be more willing to buy them. The organisers behind the project work to develop links with school caterers, so that the handling of milk and dairy produce can be improved, and they promote milk consumption and encourage milk drinking to become a habit that will be carried into adulthood. The milk bar project has been extremely successful in Scotland for 18 years, and it is currently being extended across England and Wales.

Similar establishments
A "dairy bar" is the term for a similar restaurant/store common in the Northeastern United States, especially upstate New York, which is a large producer of dairy products. A "malt shop" (named for the ingredient in a malted milkshake) is very similar to a milk or dairy bar, serving milkshakes and soft drinks as well as limited foods, such as hamburgers and sandwiches. Although there are still a few around, these have largely fallen out of fashion in favor of fast food.

The term dairy is also used for these establishments in some places, particularly in New Zealand.

The term bar mleczny in Poland is used to describe popular and cheap cafeterias from the communist era that still exist today. They provide a wide range of government-subsidised meals. In 2011, however, the Polish Government began to withdraw their subsidies, and this led to protests by people opposed to their closure.

See also
Milkman
Newsagent's shop

References

External links

Food retailing
Retailing in Australia
Restaurants by type